A ludeme is "an element of play" within a card game or board game, as distinct from an "instrument of play" which forms part of the equipment with which a game is played. An example of a ludeme is the L-shaped movement of a knight in chess, whereas the knight itself is an instrument of play.

Origin 
The term was originally coined by French game writer Pierre Berloquin. Borvo, one of the first to use the term, defines it as a 'type rule' such as the method of trick-taking in a card game or the leap capture in a board game.

See also 
 Game mechanics

References 

Board games
Card game terminology